Charles Goodman was an architect.

Charles Goodman may also refer to:

Rusty Goodman (Charles F. Goodman), singer/songwriter
Chip Goodman (Atlas/Seaboard Comics) Atlas/Seaboard Comics#Chip Goodman Marvel's editorial director
Sir Charles Goodman, High Sheriff of Denbighshire in 1665
Charles Goodman, fictional character in Strange Justice
Charlie Goodman of Jewish Socialists' Group

See also
Charles Goodman Tebbutt, English speedskater and bandy player
Charles M. Goodman House, historic home located at Alexandria, Virginia